Glade Creek is a stream in the U.S. state of Georgia.

Glade Creek took its name from the Glade Mining Company, which maintained a presence in the area in the 1830s.

References

Rivers of Georgia (U.S. state)
Rivers of Habersham County, Georgia